The Aligarh Muslim University Students' Union (AMUSU) is the official Students' Union of the Aligarh Muslim University, Aligarh, India.
The Aligarh Muslim University Students' Union is the university-wide representative body for students and is autonomous in nature. It works according to their own Constitution written by Amin A. Bulbuliya. It is primarily responsible for building and preserving a healthy political culture and an atmosphere of open debates on the campus. Students are kept informed about the public meetings, discussions and other issues through pamphlets and notices.

History
It was established as a Students' Debating Society named after the first principal Henry George Impey Siddons of Muhammadan Anglo-Oriental College, the parent body of Aligarh Muslim University, on the model of Cambridge Union Society. The club was started in 1884 at Strachey Hall, located at the college premises. Debates of various issues related to Muslims of India and the world used to be conducted in the Siddons Union Club. The club had enthusiasm among the students of the M.A.O. College for its debates and English Style Club used to inculcate the debating skills and knowledge of English Language among the students. The founder, Sir Syed Ahmad Khan considered competence in English and "debating skills" necessary for maintaining Muslims' political influence, especially in Northern India. Khan's image for the college was based on his visit to Oxford and Cambridge and he wanted to establish an education system similar to the British model.

List of presidents
The Union Presidents of the last 20 years are as follows.
 Nadim Asrar (1999 - 2000) 
 Naseem Ashraf (2004 - 2005) 
 Abdul Hafeez (2005 - 2006) 
 Mr. Nafees Ahmad (2006 - 2007) 
 Abu Affan Farooqui (2010 - 2011) 
 Syed Sharique Ahmad (2011 - 2012) 
 Shahzad Alam Barni (2012 - 2013) 
 Abdullah Azzam (2014 - 2015) 
 Faizul Hasan (2016-2017) 
 Mr. Maksoor Ahmad Usmani (2017-2018)
 Salman Imtiyaz (2018-2019)

List of vice presidents
 S.M. Haider Ali Khan (Asad) (1991-92)
 Mazin Hussain Zaidi (2006–07)
 Tauseef Alam (2012–13)
 Syed Masoodul Hasan (2014-15)
 Nadeem Ansari (2016–17)
Sajjad Subhan Rather (2017–18)
Hamza Sufyan (2018–19)

List of Honorary Secretaries 

 Farrukh Khan (2005 - 2006)
Aamir Qutub (2010-11)
 Nabeel Usmani (2016–17)
Mohd Fahad (2017–18)
 Huzaifa Aamir Rashadi (2018-2019 )

Lifetime members
 Mahatma Gandhi was the first life member of the union and was conferred upon him on 1920. 
 Muhammad Iqbal, Muslim poet and philosopher (1929)
 Khan Abdul Ghaffar Khan, Pashtun freedom fighter (1934)
 Mohammad Ali Jinnah, Founder of Pakistan (1938)
 Jawaharlal Nehru, Ex-Prime Minister of India (1948)

 Saud bin Abdulaziz Al Saud, King of Saudi Arabia (1955)

 Mother Teresa, Social Worker (1983)
 Dalai Lama, Tibetan spiritual leader (1998)
 Anwar Sadat, Ex-President of Egypt (1955)
 Mohammed Zahir Shah, King of Afghanistan (1958)
 Gamal Abdel Nasser, President of Egypt (1960)
 Gamal Salem, Egyptian Revolutionary (1955)
 Soraya Esfandiary-Bakhtiary, Queen of Iran (1956)
 Dr. Rajendra Prasad, Ex-President of India (1951)
 V.V. Giri, Former President of India (1958)
 Morarji Desai, Former Prime Minister of India (1959)
 Abul Hasan Ali Hasani Nadwi, Noted Islamic Scholar (1959)
 Sir Alexander R. Todd, Nobel Laureate in Science (1960)
 Sarojini Naidu, Indian Activist 
 Refi Cevat Ulunay, Turkish Journalist (1952)
 Ahmet Emin Yalman, Turkish Journalist (1952)
 Arthur H. Compton, Chancellor of Washington University (1950)
 C. V. Raman, Scientist
 Ahmad Matin-Daftari, Ex-Prime Minister of Iran (1952)
 Sachin Pilot, Deputy Chief Minister of Rajasthan.
 Teesta Setalvad, Indian Civil Rights activist and journalist (2018)
 Asghar Hikmat, Iranian Politician (1944)
 E. M. Forster and many more are also life members of the union

Notable alumni 
 Azam Khan, M.P, 9 times M.L.A. and Cabinet Minister was an Honorary Secretary of the union.
 Mohammad Adeeb, Rajya Sabha M.P was a President of Union.
 Arif Mohammad Khan, Governor of Kerala, was a President and Honorary Secretary of the Union in 1972-73 and 1971-72 respectively.
Nafees Ahmad, Minister of State, M.L.A. was the President of Union.
Mohammad Ali Ashraf Fatmi, Former Minister of State in the Ministry of Human Resource Development was the Honorary Secretary of Union.

References

External links 

 

Aligarh Muslim University
1884 establishments in India
Student organisations in India
Organizations established in 1884